The 2009–10 North of Scotland Cup was won by Inverness Caledonian Thistle.

2009–10 Competing Clubs
Bonar Bridge
Brora Rangers
Clachnacuddin
Elgin City
Forres Mechanics
Fort William
Golspie Sutherland
Halkirk Utd
Inverness Caledonian Thistle
Lossiemouth
Nairn County
Rothes
Strathspey Thistle
Wick Academy

First round

Second round

Semi finals

Final

References

North of Scotland Cup seasons
North of Scotland Cup